Emmanuelle, Queen of the Galaxy (also known in some releases as Emmanuelle: First Contact) is a 1994 television film, which was the first episode from the erotic series Emmanuelle in Space, also giving its name to the theme song for the series. It was directed by Lev L. Spiro, produced by Alain Siritzky, and written by Daryl Haney and Noel Harrison.

Cast
 Krista Allen as Emmanuelle
 Paul Michael Robinson as Captain Haffron Williams
 Tiendra Demian as Tasha
 Reginald Chevalier as Raymond
 Hu Beaumont as Alain
 Bill Rojas as Agent 2
 Brett Wagner as Agent 3
 Neil Delama as Aleksandru
 Robert Drake as  John
 Carl Ferro as Martin
 Jonathon Breck as Cop
 Timothy Di Pri as Theo
 Sun Yung Gai as Monk 1
 Rick Mali as Monk 2
 Kent James as Jeremy
 John Huey as The Bartender
 Bill Klein as Jimmy
 Derek Krueger as Derek
 Claude Knowlton as Leonardo
 Derek Layne as Henry
 Jack Lawson as Philip
 Kirt Lesow as Gentleman
 Mark Scavetta as Max
 P.S. Sono as The Abbot
 John Wongstein as Dharka
 Kimberly Rowe as Angie
 M. Nune as Michael
 Brad Nick'ell as Pierre
 Jesus Nebot as Don Remeo
 Robert Nassry as Dimitri
 Andrew Lim as Trungpa
 Steve Michaels as Dirk
 David Madell as John
 Debra K. Beatty
 Chanda
 Angela Cornell 1

References

External links

American television films
1994 television films
1994 films
Films with screenplays by Daryl Haney
Films directed by Lev L. Spiro